The grand prix catholique de littérature is a French literary prize awarded by the Association des écrivains catholiques de langue française (established in 1886).

History 
Usually awarded in spring, its amount is variable. After three years of interruption, it has been awarded again since 2000.

List of laureates 
 1951: Claude Longhy for La Mesure du monde
 1952: Georges Bordonove for La Caste
 1953: Gilbert Tournier for Rhône, dieu conquis
 1954: Camille Bourniquel for Retour à Cirgue
 1955: Paul-André Lesort for Le vent souffle où il veut
 1956: Yvonne Chauffin for Les Rambourt and Louise Bugeaud for La Barre aux faucons
 1957: Jean-Claude Renard for Père, voici que l'homme
 1958: Franz Weyergans for Les Gens heureux
 1959: Maurice Zermatten for all is work
 1960: Jean Pélégri for Les Oliviers de la justice
 1961: Lucien Guissard for Écrits en notre temps
 1962: Victor-Henry Debidour for all his work and Claude Tresmontant for all his work 
 1963: Jean Montaurier for Comme à travers le feu
 1964: Jean Sulivan for Mais il y a la mer
 1965: Miklós Bátori for Le Vignoble des saints
 1966: Yves-Marie Rudel for all his work
 1967: Renée Massip for Le Rire de Sara
 1968: Henri de Lubac for Images de l'abbé Monchanin and all his work 
 1969: André Frossard for Dieu existe, je l'ai rencontré
 1970: P. Jacques Loew for all his work and Jean Rivière for La Vie simple
 1971: Patrice de La Tour du Pin for Une Lutte pour la vie
 1972: Michel Huriet for La Fiancée du roi
 1973: Lucien Farago for Mademoiselle Marguerite
 1974: P. François Varillon for L’Humilité de Dieu
 1975: Valentin-Yves Mudimbe for Entre les eaux
 1976: Jacques de Bourbon Busset for Au vent de la mémoire (Journal VI)
 1977: Jean Delumeau for Le christianisme va-t-il mourir ?
 1978: Maurice Schumann for Angoisse et Certitude
 1980: P. Jean-Robert Armogathe for Paul, ou l’impossible unité
 1981: Jean Mialet for Le Déporté (la haine et le pardon)
 1982: Jean Séverin for Une vie peuplée d'enfants
 1983: Père Bernard Bro for all his work 
 1984: Pierre Pierrard for L'Église et les ouvriers
 1985: Christian Chabanis for Dieu existe-t-il ? oui
 1986: Jeanne Bourin for Le Grand Feu
 1987: Jean Daujat for all his work 
 1988: Jean Charbonnel for Edmond Michelet
 1989: Jacques Loew
 1990: Monique Piettre
 1991: Jacques Sommet for Passion des hommes et pardon de Dieu
 1992: Pierre de Calan for On retrouve Dieu partout
 1993: Christian Bobin for Le Très-Bas
 1994: Olivier Germain-Thomas for Bouddha, terre ouverte
 1995: Xavier Emmanuelli for Dernier avis avant la fin du monde
 1996: Jean-Luc Barré for Algérie, l'espoir fraternel
 2000: P. Bertrand de Margerie for Le Mystère des indulgences
 2001: Anne Bernet for Histoire générale de la chouannerie
 2002: Mgr Mansour Labaky for Kfar Sama ou les enfants de l'aurore
 2003: André Courtaigne for La Mère du printemps and Bernard Quilliet for La Tradition humaniste
 2004: Jean Sévillia for Historiquement correct : Pour en finir avec le passé unique and Yves Viollier for L’Orgueil de la tribu
 2005: Jean Dutourd for Journal intime d'un mort
 2006: Fabrice Hadjadj for Réussir sa mort. Anti-méthode pour vivre
 2007: Charles Le Quintrec for all his work. Mention to father Servais Pinckaers for Plaidoyer pour la vertu and Dorian Malovic for Le Pape jaune
 2008: Philippe Sellier for La Bible expliquée à ceux qui ne l’ont pas encore lue
 2009: Claude-Henri Rocquet for Goya and Dominique Ponnau for all his work
 2010: Claire Daudin for Le Sourire
 2011: Alain Besançon for Cinq personnages en quête d'amour. Mention to Christophe Carichon for Agnès de Nanteuil 1922-1944 une vie offerte and Nadine Cretin for Histoire du Père Noël
 2012: Eugène Green for La Communauté universelle.
 2013: Didier Rance for John Bradburne, le vagabond de Dieu. Mention to Jean-Paul Mongin for Denys l'Aréopagite et le nom de Dieu.
 2014: François Taillandier for L'Écriture du monde. Mention to Véronique Dufief for La Souffrance désarmée and father Michaël Brétéché for L'Enfance retrouvée
 2015: Isabelle Laurent for Les Deux Couronnes. Mention to Denis Moreau for Pour la vie and Christophe Ferré for Vierge d'amour
 2016: Marie-Joëlle Guillaume for Vincent de Paul. Mention to Jehanne Nguyen for Violette and Patrice de Plunkett for La révolution du pape François. 
 2017: François Cassingena-Trévedy

Laureates of the Prix du renouveau français 
 1946: Claude Franchet for  Les Trois Demoiselles de Colas
 1947: Élisabeth Barbier for Les Gens de Mogador
 1948: Raïssa Maritain for Les Grandes Amitiés
 1949: Henri Queffélec for Au bout du monde
 1950: Pierre-Henri Simon for Les Raisins verts

References

External links 
 Le GRAND PRIX CATHOLIQUE DE LITTÉRATURE
 Grand prix catholique de littérature on LivresHebdo
 Grand prix catholique de littérature 2012 on France-catholique.fr
 ASSOCIATION DES ÉCRIVAINS CATHOLIQUES DE LANGUE FRANCAISE on ecrivains-catholiques.fr

French literary awards
Awards established in 1945
1945 establishments in France